The North East Surrey College Of Technology (NESCOT) is a large further education and higher education college in Epsom and Ewell, Surrey, England that  began as Ewell Technical College in the 1950s.

Facilities
Nescot has specialist practical facilities including a construction department on site with trade specific workshops for Bricklaying, Plumbing, Carpentry, Electrical Installation and Plastering. Performance and Media have dance studios, recording facilities, dark rooms and a Mac suite. The college also has two theatres, one traditional with tiered seating which was used by Kingswood House School in their production of Peter Pan in February 2016, it was the first time the theatre had ever been used with flying as part of a production and a modern performance space. Other curriculum areas are supported with a beauty salon, onsite nursery, labs, an Animal Care Centre, Student Advice Centre, Learning Resource Centre - and an Osteopathy clinic.

The college sports centre, gym, salon, nursery and playing fields are open to the general public.

Structure and organisation
The college is governed by The Nescot Further Education Corporation.

Academic profile
As of 2018-2019 the college drew around 5,000 students from the local community, nationally and overseas.

In addition to the traditional further education college subjects, the college offers distance learning, and customised training programmes for businesses.

Higher education
The college offers higher education in Animal Care, Osteopathy, Computing, Teaching, and counselling, among others.

Software training
The school is recognised as an Apple Authorised Training Centre and holds academy status with Cisco Systems, Microsoft, and Oracle as a specialist training provider.

Performance
A 2016  Ofsted inspection  assessed the school overall as Grade 2 (good), with Grade 1 (outstanding) in several areas.

Notable alumni
David Bellamy, author, broadcaster, environmental campaigner and botanist
Anthoni Salim, businessman, investor, and money manager
Professor Peter Saville, psychologist
Joe Wicks (coach), fitness coach
Jane Wilson-Howarth, author

References

Further education colleges in Surrey